The souffia or western vairone (Telestes souffia) is a species of ray-finned fish in the family Cyprinidae. It is found in Austria, Bosnia and Herzegovina, Croatia, Czech Republic, France, Germany, Hungary, Italy, Liechtenstein, Romania, Slovenia, Slovakia, Switzerland and Ukraine.

References

Telestes
Fish described in 1827
Taxonomy articles created by Polbot